Edward C. Corrigan (May 24, 1843 - July 4, 1924) was a Canadian-born racetrack proprietor, racehorse owner/breeder and trainer in American Thoroughbred racing whose New York Times obituary called him a "Once Powerful Turf Figure" and along with The San Francisco Examiner, the Chicago Examiner and other U.S. newspapers regularly referred to him as the "Master of Hawthorne" for his role as the founder of Hawthorne Race Course which opened in Cicero, Illinois in 1891. Corrigan was the 1890 Kentucky Derby winning owner and trainer and in a 1911 article on Derby history the Daily Racing Form wrote that Edward Corrigan was "the man who at one time controlled more racing property and owned a greater stable of horses than any other turfman of his time."

References

1843 births
1924 deaths
American horse racing industry executives
American racehorse owners and breeders
American horse trainers
Owners of Kentucky Derby winners
People from Lévis, Quebec